Asaf Beşpınar (Kadıköy, Istanbul – Istanbul) was a Turkish footballer and engineer. He was among the founding line-up of the Turkish football club Fenerbahçe. 

Beşpınar, being an alumnus of Saint Joseph's College in Istanbul, had close ties with other founding members of the club, who studied at the same school.

References

Turkish footballers
Fenerbahçe S.K. footballers
Association footballers not categorized by position
Year of birth missing
Year of death missing
People from Kadıköy
Footballers from Istanbul